Masters of Russian Animation is a Russian four-DVD animation collection that contains 45 short animations and stop-motion animations. Animated in the Soviet Union and later released in 2000, the cartoons contain different styles in animation and painting. The animations were released from different years, beginning with the oldest, Story of One Crime (1962), to the more recent, Croak X Croak (1991).

Content

Volume 1 (1962-1968)

 Story of One Crime
 Man in the Frame
 My Green Crocodile
 There Lived Kozyavin
 Mountain of Dinosaurs
 Passion of Spies
 Glass Harmonica
 Ball of Wool
 Singing Teacher
 Film, Film, Film

Volume 2 (1969-1978)

 Ballerina on the Boat
 Seasons
 Armoire
 The Battle of Kerzhenets
 Butterfly
 Island
 Fox and Rabbit
 The Heron and the Crane
 Hedgehog in the Fog
 Crane's Feathers
 Firing Range
 Contact

Volume 3 (1979-1985)

 Tale of Tales
 Hunt
 Last Hunt
 There Once Was a Dog
 Travels of an Ant
 Cabaret
 Lion and Ox
 Wolf and Calf
 Old Stair
 King's Sandwich
 About Sidorov Vova

Volume 4 (1986-1991)

 Door
 Boy is a Boy
 Liberated Don Quixote
 Martinko
 Big Underground Ball
 Cat and Clown
 Dream
 Cat and Company
 Kele
 Alters Ego
 Girlfriend
 Croak X Croak

See also 
History of Russian animation
Soyuzmultfilm

References

Animation compilation